Central Elementary School is a pair of historic school buildings in New Bern, Craven County, North Carolina. The First New Bern Academy is located on New Street and was built about 1806. It is a two-story, brick building with a hipped roof and two interior ridge chimneys. It features a semicircular tetrastyle entrance porch with Tuscan order columns and a roof cupola.  It has a rear addition dated to the late-19th century. The Second New Bern Academy was built in 1884 to replace the previous building. The buildings retained their educational functions until 1971. The 1806 building now houses a museum, while the 1884 building has been converted into apartments.

The buildings were listed on the National Register of Historic Places in 1972.

References

External links

Historic American Buildings Survey in North Carolina
School buildings on the National Register of Historic Places in North Carolina
School buildings completed in 1806
Buildings and structures in New Bern, North Carolina
National Register of Historic Places in Craven County, North Carolina